Female on the Beach is a 1955 American crime-drama film directed by Joseph Pevney starring Joan Crawford and Jeff Chandler in a story about a widow and her beach bum lover.  The screenplay by Robert Hill and Richard Alan Simmons was based on the play The Besieged Heart by Robert Hill.  The film was produced by Albert Zugsmith.

Cast
 Joan Crawford as Lynn Markham
 Jeff Chandler as Drummond Hall
 Jan Sterling as Amy Rawlinson
 Cecil Kellaway as Osbert Sorenson
 Judith Evelyn as Eloise Crandall
 Charles Drake as Police Lieutenant Galley
 Natalie Schafer as Queenie Sorenson
 Stuart Randall as Frankovitch
 Marjorie Bennett as Mrs. Murchison

Production
The script was based on an unproduced play by Bob Hill, The Besieged Heart. Albert Zugsmith bought the rights and worked on the script with Bob Hill. He then sold the project to Universal who were looking for a vehicle for Joan Crawford. The studio also hired Zugsmith to produce, starting a relationship between him and Universal which lasted several years.

Reception

Critical response
A review in Harrison's Reports said that the movie offered "a fairly interesting though somewhat seamy mixture of sex, murder and suspense."

Film critic Bosley Crowther gave the film a mixed review, writing "Their progress is rendered no more fetching by the inanities of a hackneyed script and the artificiality and pretentiousness of Miss Crawford's acting style. At the end, the guilty party is revealed in a ridiculous way. Jan Sterling, Cecil Kellaway and Natalie Schafer are the supporting players you may remotely suspect."

See also
List of American films of 1955

References

External links
 
 
 
 
Review of film at Variety

1955 films
1950s psychological thriller films
American crime drama films
American psychological thriller films
American black-and-white films
Film noir
Films directed by Joseph Pevney
Universal Pictures films
1950s English-language films
1950s American films
1955 crime drama films